The Finnish language is spoken by the majority of the population in Finland and by ethnic Finns elsewhere. Unlike the languages spoken in neighbouring countries, such as Swedish and Norwegian, which are North Germanic languages, or Russian, which is a Slavic language, Finnish is a Uralic language of the Finnic languages group. Typologically, Finnish is agglutinative. As in some other Uralic languages, Finnish has vowel harmony, and like other Finnic languages, it has consonant gradation.

Pronouns
The pronouns are inflected in the Finnish language much in the same way that their referent nouns are.

Personal pronouns
⠀⠀Personal pronouns are used to refer to human beings only. The personal pronouns in Finnish in the nominative case are listed in the following table:

{| class="wikitable"
|-
|+ Personal pronouns
|-
! Finnish !! English
|-
! colspan="2"  style="background:#efefef;" | Singular
|-
| || I
|-
| || you
|-
| || he/she
|-
! colspan="2" style="background:#efefef;" | Plural
|-
| || we
|-
| || you
|-
| || they
|-
! colspan="2" style="background:#efefef;" | Polite
|-
| || you
|}

Because Finnish verbs are inflected for person and number, in the Finnish standard language subject pronouns are not required, and the first and second-person pronouns are usually omitted except when used for emphasis. In the third person, however, the pronoun is required:  '(s)he goes',  'they go'. In spoken Finnish, all pronouns are generally used, even without emphatic meaning.

Some common verbs, such as  "to be" and  "to come", exhibit similarly reduced colloquial forms:

{| class="wikitable"
|-
|+ Personal pronouns
|-
! Written/formal !! Spoken/colloquial
|-
! colspan="2"  style="background:#efefef;" | Singular
|-
||| 
|-
||| 
|-
||| 
|-
! colspan="2" style="background:#efefef;" | Plural
|-
||| 
|-
||| 
|-
||| 
|-
! colspan="2" style="background:#efefef;" | Polite
|-
||| 
|}

The second-person plural can be used as a polite form when addressing one person, as in some Indo-European languages. However, this usage is diminishing in Finnish society.

Demonstrative pronouns
The demonstratives are used of non-human animate entities and inanimate objects. Furthermore, the demonstratives are used to refer to group nouns and the number of the pronoun must correlate with the number of its referent.

{| class="wikitable"
|-
|+ Demonstrative pronouns
|-
! Finnish !! English
|-
! colspan="2"  style="background:#efefef;" | Singular
|-
| || this
|-
| || that
|-
| || it/that
|-
! colspan="2" style="background:#efefef;" | Plural
|-
| || these
|-
| || those
|-
| || they/those
|}

Interrogative pronouns
{| class="wikitable"
|-
|+ Interrogative pronouns
|-
! Finnish !! English
|-
| || who, which (of many)
|-
| || what, which (of many)
|-
| || who, which (of many) — old or dialectal word
|-
| || which (of two)
|-
| || which (of two) — old or dialectal word
|}

Relative pronouns
{| class="wikitable"
|-
|+ Relative pronouns
|-
! Pronoun !! Example !! English
|-
| (refers to preceding word)
| 
| "s/he is the only one whom (I) remember"
|-
| (refers to preceding clause/sentence or to a pronoun or a superlative that refers to a thing)
| 
| "it is the only thing that (I) remember"
|}

Reciprocal pronouns
{| class="wikitable"
|-
|+ Reciprocal pronouns
|-
! Pronoun !! Example !! English
|-
| rowspan="2" | toinen
| 
| "they love each other" (plural)
|-
| 
| "they love one another" (dual)
|}

Reflexive pronouns
{| class="wikitable"
|-
|+ Reflexive pronouns
|-
! Pronoun !! Suffix !! Example !! English
|-
| 
| plus corresponding possessive suffix
| 
| "(I) made myself some tea"
|}

Indefinite pronouns
A large group that entails all of the pronouns that do not fall into any of the categories above. Notice that there are no negative pronouns, such as "nobody"; rather, the positive pronoun is negated with the negative verb . No double negatives are possible.

{| class="wikitable"
|-
|+ Indefinite pronouns
|-
! Finnish !! English
|-
|  (uninflected) || every, each
|-
|  || every, everyone
|-
|  || some, someone (person)
|-
|  || either one
|-
|  || some, something (animal, thing)
|-
|  || each one
|-
|  || both (old or dialectal)
|-
|  || both
|-
|  || each thing (dialectal)
|-
|  || anyone (old or poetic)
|-
| ,  (oblique) || anyone
|-
| →  || no one
|-
|  || either one
|-
| →  || neither one
|-
|  || anything
|-
| →  || nothing
|-
| ,  (oblique) || the ordinal pronoun (representing first, second, etc.)
|}

Each pronoun declines. "any",  "from any". There are irregular nominatives. "(not) anyone",  "from (not) anyone".

English lacks a direct equivalent to the pronoun ; it would be "that-th", or "which-th" for questions. For example,  "The reward depends on as-which-th one comes to the finish", or explicitly "The reward depends on in which position one comes to the finish". It would be difficult to translate the question , but, although far from proper English, the question How manyeth may give an English-speaking person an idea of the meaning.

Some indefinite adjectives are often perceived as indefinite pronouns. These include:

{| class="wikitable"
|-
|+ Indefinite adjectives
|-
! Finnish !! English
|-
|  || the only one
|-
|  || some, certain, one
|-
|  || few
|-
|  (non-reflexive) || self
|-
|  || all, everyone, everything
|-
|  || both
|-
|  || many
|-
|  || other
|-
|  || some, a few
|-
|  || same
|-
|  (non-reciprocal, non-numeral use) || another
|}

Noun forms
The Finnish language does not distinguish gender in nouns or even in personal pronouns:  is 'he', 'she', 'they' (singular), or 'it' depending on the referent. There are no articles, neither definite nor indefinite.

Possessive suffixes

Cases

Finnish has fifteen noun cases: four grammatical cases, six locative cases, two essive cases (three in some Eastern dialects), and three marginal cases. 

Some notes about the cases listed in the table above:
 There is historically some difference of opinion as to the character and indeed existence (for most words) of the accusative case in modern Finnish. The recent, authoritative grammar Iso suomen kielioppi takes the position that only the personal pronouns and the personal interrogative pronoun  have a true accusative case which is distinguished by the suffix . For nouns, adjectives, numerals, and other pronouns, there is no accusative case; instead, these words take the nominative or genitive in object positions (where they do not take the partitive). This differs from the more traditional view, to which many learners' grammars still adhere, that there are accusative forms that appear identical to the nominative or genitive.
 A noun in the comitative case is always followed by a possessive suffix. However, as is typical in Finnish, an adjective does not take possessive suffixes:  "A man with his luxurious house(s)", with comitative  on both the adjective and noun, but the third person possessive suffix  on the noun only.
 Regarding the illative suffix : "V" stands in for a preceding (short) vowel:  yields , but  yields .

Relationship between locative cases 
As in other Uralic languages, locative cases in Finnish can be classified according to three criteria: the spatial position (interior or surface), the motion status (stationary or moving), and within the latter, the direction of the movement (approaching or departing). The table below shows these relationships schematically:

Plurals
Singular and plural numbers cross-cut the distinctions in grammatical cases, and several number/case combinations have somewhat idiosyncratic uses. Several of these deserve special mention.

Nominative/accusative plural
The nominative plural is used for definite count nouns that are subjects, while the plural object of a telic verb bears the accusative plural. This suffix can only appear in the word-final position; i.e. it is omitted when a possessive suffix is present.

{| class="wikitable"
|-
|+ Nominative plural
|-
! Finnish !! English
|-
|  || "The dogs were in the room"
|-
|  || "The rooms were large"
|-
|
|"I too saw the dogs"
|}

Numerals

When a noun is modified by a numeral greater than one, and the numeral is in the nominative singular, the noun bears the partitive singular. Otherwise, the noun and the numeral agree with each other in number and case.

{| class="wikitable"
|-
|+ Following numerals
|-
! Finnish !! English
|-
|  || "there were two dogs in the room"
|-
|  || "the house had three rooms"
|-
|  || "I bought a computer for a thousand euros"
|-
|  || "I need two pairs of shoes"
|}

Inflected plural
This uses the stem of the partitive plural inflected with the same set of endings as for singular nouns.

{| class="wikitable"
|-
|+ Inflected plural
|-
! Finnish !! English
|-
|  →  || '(some) rooms'
|-
| →  || 'in rooms'
|}

As a combined example of plurals

{| class="wikitable"
|-
|+ Inflected plural
|-
! Finnish !! English
|-
|  || 'the bird is in the tree'
|-
| →  || 'the birds are in the trees'
|}

Inflection of pronouns

The personal pronouns are inflected in the same way as nouns, and can be found in most of the same cases as nouns. For example:

{| class="wikitable"
|-
|+ Inflection of pronouns
|-
! Finnish !! Case !! Example !! English
|-
|  || nominative || || 'I'
|-
| rowspan="3" |  || rowspan="3" | genitive || || ('my, mine')
|-
|  ||  'this house is mine'
|-
|  ||  'this is my house'
|-
|  || accusative ||  || 's/he knows me'
|-
|  || partitive ||   ||  's/he loves me'
|-
|  || inessive ||  ||  'this provokes ( awakens) anger in me'
|-
|  || elative ||   ||  's/he was talking about/of me'. Also used idiomatically to mean 'in my opinion'.
|-
|  || illative ||   ||  's/he believed in me'
|-
|  || adessive ||  ||  'I've got some money' (lit.'On me there's money')
|-
|  || ablative ||  ||  's/he took some money from/off me'.
|-
|  || allative ||  ||  'give me some money'
|-
|  || essive ||  || 'If I were you, I wouldn't do it' ( 'as you')
|-
|  || translative ||  ||  's/he is often mistaken for me'
|}

Noun/adjective stem types
The stem of a word is the part to which inflectional endings are affixed. For most noun and adjective types, the nominative case is identical to the basic stem (the nominative is unmarked).

Vowel stems
A word with a vowel stem is one that ends in a vowel in the nominative, and retains a final vowel in all forms. The stem vowel can however change in certain inflected forms:

{| class="wikitable"
|-
!English
!stem vowel
!singular
! 
! 
!plural
! 
! 
!Notes
|-
|fish
|
|
|
|
|
|
|
|-
|corner
|
|
|
|
|
|
|
|-
|summer
|
|
|
|
|
|
|
| +  becomes .
|-
|name
|
|
|
|
|
|
|
| becomes  at the end of a word;  +  becomes .
|-
|hall
|
|
|
|
|
|
|
| +  becomes .
|-
|light
|
|
|
|
|
|
|
|A stem with a labial vowel  is invariable; plural  becomes  between vowels.
|-
|teddy bear
|
|
|
|
|
|
|
|Invariable e-stems can be found in very recent coinages.
|-
|land, earth
|
|
|
|
|
|
|
|A long vowel is shortened before the oblique plural .
|-
|road
|
|
|
|
|
|
|
|Historical long mid vowels  have been diphthongized, but the original vowel survives in shortened forms.
|}

The change of original (pre-Proto-Finnic) final *e to  means that the stem vowel of a word ending in  cannot be determined from the nominative alone; one of the inflected forms must be consulted. However, most old inherited words ending in  decline as e-stems (or consonants stems, see below), while modern loans, where  frequently is added for phonotactic reasons (as in the case of ), always decline as i-stems.

Consonant stems
A word with a consonant stem is one where case suffixes can in some cases be affixed directly after the last consonant for at least some forms. Words with consonant stems come in three broad classes.

The first class of consonant-stem words largely resemble e-stems, but allow elision of the stem vowel in the partitive singular, and for certain words, plural genitive. In the later case, this involves a special allomorph , employing the plural marker  rather than /.

The final consonant in words of this class must be one of h, l, m, n, r, s, t. Other remarks for e-stem words still apply.

{| class="wikitable"
|-
!English
!stem
!singular
! 
! 
!plural
! 
! 
!Notes
|-
|goat
|
|
|
|
|
|
|
|
|-
|wind
|
|
|
|
|
|, 
|
|
|-
|broth
|
|
|
|
|
|, 
|
| m → n before t.
|-
| sound
|
|
|
|
|
|, 
|
|
|-
|bow
|
|
|
|
|
|, 
|
|
|}

Words of this type may have somewhat irregular declension due to additional historical changes:

{| class="wikitable"
|-
!English
!stem
!singular
! 
! 
!plural
! 
! 
!Notes
|-
|child
|
|
|
|
|
|, 
|
| rowspan="2"| The first consonant in a cluster of three is lost: Cs + t → st. 
|-
|knife
|
|
|
|
|
|
|
|-
|hand
|
|
|
|
|
|, 
|
| rowspan="2"| ti becomes si. (Variation of t/d, nt/nn is regular and due to consonant gradation.)
|-
| nail
|
|
|
|
|
|
|
|-
| two
|
|
|
|
|
|
|
| In addition to the previous changes, kt and ktt become ht/hd.
|}

For some words of this type, modern Finnish displays a tendency of development from consonant-stems to e-stems.

Another class of consonant-stem words end in a consonant even in the nominative; if a stem vowel is required for phonotactic reasons, e again appears. Modern Finnish only allows dental and alveolar consonants (l, n, r, s, t) to occur as word-final, but originally, words ending in h, k, m were possible as well.
{| class="wikitable"
|-
!English
!stem
!singular
! 
! 
!plural
! 
! 
!Notes
|-
|joint
|
|
|
|
|
|, 
|
| 
|-
|core
|
|
|
|
|
|, 
|
| m → n when word-final or before t.
|-
|perch
|
|
|
|
|
|, 
|
|
|-
|sister
|
|
|
|
|
|, 
|
|
|-
|beer
|
|
|
|
|
|
|
| t disappears in vowel-stem forms due to consonant gradation.
|}

Nouns ending in -s
Vocalization or lenition is found in addition to any possible consonant gradation, e.g.  (nominative) ~  (genitive), or  ~ . The illatives are marked thus: , .

-nen nouns
This is a very large class of words which includes common nouns (for example  'woman'), many proper names, and many common adjectives. Adding  to a noun is a very productive mechanism for creating adjectives ( 'dirt, filth' →  'dirty';  'joy' →  'merry, happy';  'plastic' →  'made of plastic'/'plastic-like' ). It can also function as a diminutive ending.

{| class="wikitable"
|-
! Finnish !! English
|-
|  || 'in the plastic bag'
|-
|  || 'two plastic toys'
|-
|  || 'into the plastic box'
|}

Here are some of the diminutive forms that are in use:

{| class="wikitable"
|-
! Finnish !! Stemming from !! English
|-
|  ||  || 'a small hand' (affectionate)
|-
|  ||  || 'birdie', 'a small bird'
|-
|  ||  || 'lad'
|-
|  ||  || 'booklet'
|-
|  ||  || 'a little flower'
|-
|  ||  || 'a little child'
|}

A special class of Finnish nouns in -nen are surnames. Some of these are very old and often their original meaning is not readily apparent to a modern speaker. Many were later coined on the -nen pattern and these often have the suffix added to a word meaning a natural feature. Some representative examples are:

{| class="wikitable"
|-
! Finnish !! From word !! English
|-
|  ||  || blacksmith (of a blacksmith's family)
|-
|  ||  || 'deaf' (of a deaf man's family)
|-
|  ||  || 'sorrowful, melancholic'; alternatively male name  as short for Leonard
|-
| 'the family from by the stream, river, lake, peninsula'
|-
|  || || [A family name assimilated from the name of the farmhouse, after the householder's name 'Mikko']
|-
|  || || possible origin , a South Karelian surname
|-
|}

The suffix  also occurs in place-names. Many place-names ending with  assume a plural form when inflected.

-e nouns
Older *-h and *-k-stems have changed rather drastically. The consonant does not survive in any form of the paradigm, and these nouns make the appearance of ending in an unchanging . However, the former existence of a consonant in still seen in that the dictionary form represents weak gradation, and each word has two stems, a weak grade stem in which the former final consonant has assimilated (used for the partitive singular), and strong grade vowel stem to which most case suffixes are applied. 'rust' → ).

By analogy, in standard Finnish all words ending in 'e' behave as former  stems. In some dialects, the  stems have however shifted to  instead, e.g. standard , in Pohjanmaa  ← .

The weak grade stem, which is found in the 'dictionary' form results from another historic change in which a final consonant has been lost.  This is important to word inflection, because the partitive ending is suffixed directly onto this stem, where the consonant has been assimilated to a  instead of being lost.  Other case endings are suffixed to the strong grade/vowel stem.

{| class="wikitable"
|-
|+ -e nouns
|-
! case !!  'room' !!  'device'
|-
! partitive 
|   'two rooms' ||   'two devices'
|-
! nominative 
|   'rooms' ||   'devices'
|-
! inessive 
|   'in the room' ||   'in the device'
|-
! illative 
|   'into the room' ||   'into the device'
|}

More of this phenomenon is discussed in Finnish Phonology: Sandhi.

Adjectives
Adjectives in Finnish are inflected in exactly the same way as nouns, and an adjective must agree in number and case with the noun it is modifying.

For example, here are some adjectives:

{| class="wikitable"
|-
! Finnish !! English
|-
|  || 'big'
|-
|  || 'small'
|-
|  || 'red'
|}

And here are some examples of adjectives inflected to agree with nouns:

{| class="wikitable"
|-
! Finnish !! English
|-
|  || 'in front of the big house'
|-
|  || 'two small houses'
|-
|  || 'in the red house'
|}

Notice that the adjectives undergo the same sorts of stem changes when they are inflected as nouns do.

Comparative formation
The comparative of the adjective is formed by adding  to the inflecting stem. For example:

{| class="wikitable"
|-
! Finnish !! English !! Finnish !! English
|-
|  || 'big' ||  || 'bigger'
|-
|  || 'small' ||  || 'smaller'
|-
|  || 'red' ||  || 'redder'
|}

Since the comparative adjective is still an adjective, it must be inflected to agree with the noun it modifies. To make the inflecting stem of the comparative, the  ending loses its final i. If the syllable context calls for a weak consonant, the  becomes . This should become clear with a few examples:

{| class="wikitable"
|-
! Finnish !! English
|-
|  || 'in front of the bigger house'
|-
|  || 'two smaller houses'
|-
|  || 'in the redder house'
|-
|  || 'in the redder houses'
|}

Superlative formation
The superlative of the adjective is formed by adding  to the inflecting stem. For example:

{| class="wikitable"
|-
|+ Superlative formation
|-
! Finnish !! English !! Finnish !! English
|-
|  || 'big' ||   || 'biggest'
|-
|  || 'red' ||   || 'reddest'
|}

{| class="wikitable"
|-
! Finnish !! English !! Finnish !! English
|-
|  || 'small' ||  (not *) || 'smallest'
|}

Since the superlative adjective is still an adjective, it must be inflected to agree with the noun it modifies. Here are the examples:

{| class="wikitable"
|-
! Finnish !! English
|-
|  || 'in front of the biggest house'
|-
|  || 'the two smallest houses'
|-
|  || 'in the reddest house'
|-
|  || 'in the reddest houses'
|}

Irregular forms
The most important irregular form is:

{| class="wikitable"
|-
|+ Main irregular form
|-
! Finnish !! English
|-
|  || 'good, better, best'
|}

The form  "good" is not found in standard Finnish, but can be found in the Southern Ostrobothnian dialect.

Notice also:

{| class="wikitable"
|-
! colspan="3" style="background:#cfcfcf;" | More irregular forms
|-
! Finnish !! Hypothetic regular !! English
|-
|  ||  || 'long, longer, longest'
|-
|  ||  || 'short, shorter, shortest'(although the standard forms are also used)
|}

There are a small number of other irregular comparative and superlative forms, such as:

{| class="wikitable"
|-
! Finnish !! English
|-
|  || 'new, newer, newest'
|}

Where the inflecting stem is  but the superlative is  = 'newest'.

Postpositions and prepositions
Postpositions are more common in Finnish than prepositions. Both postpositions and prepositions can be combined with either a noun or a possessive suffix to form a postpositional phrase.

Postpositions
Postpositions indicate place, time, cause, consequence or relation. In postpositional phrases the noun is usually in genitive:

{| class="wikitable"
|-
|+ Postpositions
|-
! Finnish !! English
|-
|  || 'under the table'
|-
|  || 'after Christmas'
|-
|  || 'for the sake of the children'
|-
|  || 'on behalf of somebody'
|}

The noun (or pronoun) can be omitted when there is a possessive suffix:

{| class="wikitable"
|-
! Finnish !! English
|-
|  || '(I) am next to (you)' or'(I) am by (your) side'
|}

As with verbs, the pronoun cannot be omitted in the third person (singular or plural):
 "I was with you"
but  "I was with him/her"

 "I will come with you (plural or polite)"
but  "I will come with them"

Prepositions
There are few important prepositions in Finnish. In prepositional phrases the noun is always in the partitive:

{| class="wikitable"
|-
|+ Prepositions
|-
! Finnish !! English
|-
|  || before Christmas
|-
|  || without you
|}

Some postpositions can also be used as prepositions:

{| class="wikitable"
|-
|+ Postpositions as prepositions
|-
! Postposition !! Preposition !! English
|-
|  ||  || in the middle of the village
|}

Using postpositions as prepositions is not strictly incorrect and occurs in poetry, as in, for example, the song "" "under a maple tree", instead the usual .

Verb forms
 
Finnish verbs are usually divided into seven groups depending on the stem type. All seven types have the same set of endings, but the stems undergo (slightly) different changes when inflected.

There are very few irregular verbs in Finnish. In fact, only  = 'to be' has two irregular forms  "is" and  "are"; other forms follow from the stem ; e.g.  ←  "you are",  ←  "let it be". A handful of verbs, including  "to see",  "to do/make", and  "to run" have rare consonant mutation patterns which are not derivable from the infinitive.

Finnish does not have a separate verb for possession (compare English "to have"). Possession is indicated in other ways, mainly by genitives and existential clauses. This is similar to Irish and Welsh forms such as "There is a hunger on me".

Tense-aspect forms
Finnish verbs have present, imperfect, perfect and pluperfect tense-aspect forms.

Present (nonpast): corresponds to English present and future tense forms. For the latter, a time qualifier may need to be used to avoid ambiguity. The present is formed with using the personal suffixes only.
Imperfect: actually a preterite, but called "imperfect" for historical reasons; corresponds to English past continuous and past simple, indicating a past action which is complete but might have been a point event, a temporally extended event, or a repeated event. The imperfect is formed with the suffix  in addition to the personal suffixes, e.g.  "I took".
Perfect: corresponds to the English present perfect ("I have eaten") in most of its usages, but can carry more sense than in English of a past action with present effects. The form uses the verb  "to be" in the present tense as an auxiliary verb. Personal suffixes are added to the auxiliary, while the main verb is in the  participle form.
Pluperfect: corresponds to the English past perfect ("I had visited") in its usage. Similarly to perfect, the verb  is used in the past tense as an auxiliary verb. For example,  "I had taken".

As stated above, Finnish has no grammatical future tense. To indicate futurity, a Finnish speaker may use forms that are, by some, deprecated as ungrammatical. One is the use of the verb , 'to come', as it were as an auxiliary:  'This is going to be a problem', cf Swedish . Another, less common and now archaic, is to use the verb , 'to be', with the present passive participle of the main verb:  'For he shall be great in the sight of the Lord' (Luke 1:15).

Voices
Finnish has two possible verb voices: active and passive. The active voice corresponds with the active voice of English, but the Finnish passive voice has some important differences from the English passive voice.

Passive voice
The Finnish passive is unipersonal, that is, it only appears in one form regardless of who is understood to be performing the action. In that respect, it could be described as a "fourth person", since there is no way of connecting the action performed with a particular agent (except for some nonstandard forms; see below).

Consider an example:  "the house will be painted". The time when the house is being painted could be added:  "the house will be painted in November". The colour and method could be added:  "the house will be painted red with a brush". But nothing can be said about the person doing the painting; there is no simple way to say "the house will be painted by Jim". There is a calque, evidently from Swedish,  "by the action of", that can be used to introduce the agent: , approximately "The house will be painted by the action of Jim". This type of expression is considered prescriptively incorrect, but it may be found wherever direct translations from Swedish, English, etc. are made, especially in legal texts, and has traditionally been a typical feature of Finnish "officialese". An alternative form, passive + ablative, also a calque from Swedish, was once common but is now archaic.

Hence the form  is the only one which is needed. Notice also that the object is in the nominative case. Verbs which govern the partitive case continue to do so in the passive, and where the object of the action is a personal pronoun, that goes into its special accusative form:  "I was forgotten". Whether the object of a passive verb should be termed the subject of the clause has been debated, but traditionally Finnish grammars have considered a passive clause to have no subject.

Use of the passive voice is not as common in Finnish as in Germanic languages; sentences in the active voice are preferred, if possible. Confusion may result, as the agent is lost and becomes ambiguous. For instance, a bad translation of the English "the PIN code is asked for when..." into  raises the question "who asks?", whereas  ("the device asks for the PIN code when...") is unambiguous. Nevertheless, this usage of the passive is common in Finnish, particularly in literary and official contexts. Occasionally this leads to extreme cases such as  "it is wanted that the municipal board resigns", implying that there could be popular uprising near, when this suggestion is actually made by a single person.

It can also be said that in the Finnish passive the agent is always human and never mentioned. A sentence such as 'the tree was blown down' would translate poorly into Finnish if the passive were used, since it would suggest the image of a group of people trying to blow the tree down.

Colloquially, the first-person plural indicative and imperative are replaced by the passive, e.g.

Because of its vagueness about who is performing the action, the passive can also translate the English "one does (something)", "(something) is generally done", as in  "they say that..."

Formation of the passive is dealt with in the article on Finnish verb conjugation.

As first-person plural
In modern colloquial Finnish, the passive form of the verb is used instead of the active first-person plural in the indicative and the imperative, to the almost complete exclusion of the standard verb forms. Without the personal pronoun , the passive alone replaces the first-person plural imperative, as in  'Let's go!'.

Zero person
The so-called "zero person" is a construct in which a verb appears in the third-person singular with no subject, and the identity of the subject must be understood from the context. Typically the implied subject is either the speaker or their interlocutor, or the statement is intended in a general sense. The zero person has some similarity to the English use of the formal subject .

 "In the sauna, one sweats"
 "If you arrive in good time, you get a better seat"

Moods

Indicative
The indicative is the form of the verb used for making statements or asking simple questions. In the verb morphology sections, the mood referred to will be the indicative unless otherwise stated.

Conditional
The conditional mood expresses the idea that the action or state expressed by the verb may or may not actually happen. As in English, the Finnish conditional is used in conditional sentences  (for example "I would tell you if I knew") and in polite requests (for example "I would like some coffee").

In the former case, and unlike in English, the conditional must be used in both halves of the Finnish sentence:

  = *"I would understand if you would speak more slowly".

The characteristic morphology of the Finnish conditional is 'isi' inserted between the verb stem and the personal ending. This can result in a closed syllable becoming open and so trigger consonant gradation:

 = 'I know',  = 'I would know'.
 = 'I want',  = 'I would like'.

Conditional forms exist for both active and passive voices, and for present tense and perfect.

The conditional can be used for added politeness when offering, requesting, or pleading:  'Would you like some coffee?';  'May I have that red one?';  'I do wish you would tell me'.

Imperative
The imperative mood is used to express commands. In Finnish, there is only one tense form (the present-future). The possible variants of Finnish imperatives are:
 1st, 2nd or 3rd person
 singular or plural
 active or passive
 positive or negative

Active, 2nd-person imperatives
These are the most common forms of the imperative: "Do this", "Don't do that".

{| class="wikitable"
|-
|+ Active, 2nd-person imperatives
|-
! Finnish !! English
|-
|  || 'come!'
|-
|  || 'eat!'
|-
|  || 'note!'
|}

To make this negative,  (which is the active imperative singular 2nd person of the negative verb) is placed before the positive form:

{| class="wikitable"
|-
! Finnish !! English
|-
|  || 'don't say!'
|-
|  || 'don't go!'
|-
|  || 'don't lie!'(from  "to lie", type II)
|}

{| class="wikitable"
|-
! Finnish !! English
|-
|  || 'come!'
|-
|  || 'drink!'
|-
|  || 'measure!'(from  "to measure", type IV)
|}

{| class="wikitable"
|-
! Finnish !! English
|-
|  || 'don't say!'
|-
|  || 'don't go!'
|-
|  || 'don't offer!'
|}

Note that 2nd-person-plural imperatives can also be used as polite imperatives when referring to one person.

The Finnish language has no simple equivalent to the English "please". The Finnish equivalent is to use either  or  = 'be good', but it is generally omitted. Politeness is normally conveyed by tone of voice, facial expression, and use of conditional verbs and partitive nouns. For example,  means "could you", in the polite plural, and is used much like English "Could you..." sentences:  "could you help me, please?"

Also, familiar (and not necessarily so polite) expressions can be added to imperatives, e.g.

Passive imperatives
{| class="wikitable"
|-
|+ Passive imperatives
|-
! Finnish !! English
|-
|  ||  let (something) be done
|-
|  ||  let (something) not be done
|-
|  ||  let (something) have been done
|-
|  ||  let (something) not have been done
|}

3rd-person imperatives
The 3rd-person imperatives behave as if they were jussive; besides being used for commands, they can also be used to express permission. In colloquial language, they are most often used to express disregard to what one might or might not do, and the singular and plural forms are often confused.

{| class="wikitable"
|-
|+ 3rd-person imperatives
|-
! Finnish !! English
|-
|  || 'let it (him, her) be'
|-
|  || 'let them do'
|-
|  || 'let him not forget', 'he'd better not forget'
|-
|  || 'let them not forget'
|}

1st-person-plural imperatives
{| class="wikitable"
|-
|+ 1st-person-plural imperatives
|-
! Finnish !! English
|-
|  || 'let's go'
|-
|  || 'let us not do', 'we better not do'
|}

The 1st-person imperative sounds archaic, and a form resembling the passive indicative is often used instead:  = 'let's go!'

Optative
The optative mood is an archaic or poetic variant of the imperative mood that expresses hopes or wishes. It is not used in normal language.

{| class="wikitable"
|-
|+ Optative
|-
! Finnish !! English
|-
|  || if only/that/would you were
|}

Potential
The potential mood is used to express that the action or state expressed by the verb is possible but not certain. It is relatively rare in modern Finnish, especially in speech. Most commonly it is used in news reports and in official written proposals in meetings. It has only the present tense and perfect. The potential has no specific counterpart in English, but can be translated by adding "possibly" (or occasionally "probably") to the verb.

Before this affix, continuants assimilate progressively ( → ) and stops regressively ( → ). The verb  'to be' in the potential has the special suppletive form , e.g. the potential of  'has been fetched' is  'may have been fetched'.

Potential forms exists for both active and passive voices, and for present tense and perfect:

{| class="wikitable"
|-
|+ Potential
|-
! Finnish !! English
|-
|  || I may be/it's possible that I am
|-
|  || she may wash/she is [likely] to wash
|-
|  || she may fix/she is [likely] to fix
|-
|  || it is possible that they are mourning/will mourn
|-
|  || it will probably be washed (by someone)
|-
|  || you may have seen
|-
|  || possibly may not have been given (by someone)
|}

In some dialects  ('may come') is an indicative form verb ( 'comes') but grammatically it is a potential verb.

Eventive
No longer used in modern Finnish, the eventive mood is used in the Kalevala. It is a combination of the potential and the conditional. It is also used in some dialects of Estonian.

{| class="wikitable"
|-
|+ Eventive
|-
! Finnish !! English
|-
|  || 'I probably would walk'
|}

Infinitives
Finnish verbs are described as having four, sometimes five infinitives:

First infinitive
The first infinitive short form of a verb is the citation form found in dictionaries.

{| class="wikitable"
|-
! Verb stem !! Finnish infinitive !! English infinitive
|-
|  ||  || to say
|-
|  ||  || to know
|-
|  ||  || to read
|}

(This represents the historically older form of the suffix, from which the  has been lost in most environments.)

{| class="wikitable"
|-
! Verb stem !! Finnish infinitive !! English infinitive
|-
|  ||  || to bring
|-
|  ||  || to stay
|-
|  ||  || to vacuum
|-
|  ||  || to hesitate
|}

(These consonant stems take a linking vowel  when forming the present tense, or  when forming the imperfect, e.g. 'to wash':  'I wash' :  'I washed').

{| class="wikitable"
|-
! Verb stem !! Finnish infinitive !! English infinitive
|-
|  ||  || to go
|-
|  ||  || to be
|-
|  ||  || to bite
|-
|  ||  || to wash
|-
|  ||  || to mention
|}

Some verbs have so called "alternating stems" or multiple stems with weak-strong consonant gradation between them. It depends on the verb if the infinitive is in the strong or weak form. The  dropping to  weakens a preceding ,  or  so that a weak grade is seen in the first infinitive form. This often creates difficulties for the non-Finn when trying to determine the infinitive (in order to access the translation in a dictionary) when encountering an inflected form.

{| class="wikitable"
|-
! Inflected Finnish !! English !! Finnish infinitive !! English infinitive !! Note
|-
|  || I am falling ||  || to fall down ||  strong grade
|-
|  || I fell down ||  || to fall down ||  strong grade
|-
|  || I have fallen down ||  || to fall down ||  weak grade ( forces weak grade)
|-
||| they'll assemble|| || to assemble ||  strong grade
|-
|  || we'll assemble|| || to assemble ||  strong grade ( does not cause weakness because  is not a diphthong)
|}

Some verbs lose elements of their stems when forming the first infinitive. Some verbs stem have contracted endings in the first infinitive. The contracted infinitive ending / have  / verbs take the infinitive stem /. These contracted verbs may also be subject to consonant weakening when forming the infinitive

e.g.  'to mention' has the longer conjugated stem  as in  'I'll mention tomorrow that...'

e.g.  'to flee' has the longer conjugated stem   as in  'we fled from Afghanistan'

The first infinitive long form is the translative plus a possessive suffix (rare in spoken language).

{| class="wikitable"
|-
! Finnish !! English
|-
|  || '...(s/he) phoned in order to say...'
|-
|  || (idiomatic) 'as far as we know'
|-
|  || 'in order for me to be able to read'
|}

The first infinitive only has an active form.

Second infinitive
The second infinitive is used to express aspects of actions relating to the time when an action takes place or the manner in which an action happens.  In equivalent English phrases these time aspects can often be expressed using  "when", "while" or "whilst" and the manner aspects using the word "by" or else the gerund, which is formed by adding "-ing" to English verb to express manner.

It is only ever used with one of two case makers; the inessive  indicating time or the instructive  indicating manner. Finnish phrases using the second infinitive can often be rendered in English using the gerund.

The second infinitive is formed by replacing the final  of the first infinitive with  then adding the appropriate inflectional ending.

The cases in which the second infinitive can appear are:

{| class="wikitable"
|-
|+ Second infinitive
|-
! Finnish !! English
|-
! style="background:#efefef;" colspan="2" | Active inessive (while someone is in the act of)
|-
|  || 'when doing'
|-
|  || 'when saying'
|-
! style="background:#efefef;" colspan="2" | Active inessive + possessive suffix (while themselves in the act of)
|-
|  || 'while he is/was reading'
|-
|  ||'while you are/were saying'
|-
! style="background:#efefef;" colspan="2" | Passive inessive (when or while in the act of something being done)
|-
|  || 'when saying'
|-
|  || 'when doing'
|-
|  || 'when reading'
|-
! style="background:#efefef;" colspan="2" | Active instructive (by means of/while in the act of)
|-
|  || 'by doing'
|-
|  || 'by saying'
|-
|  || 'by reading'
|-
|  || 'she came into the room crying'
|}

The inessive form is mostly seen in written forms of language because spoken forms usually express the same idea in longer form using two clauses linked by the word  ("when"). The instructive is even rarer and mostly exists nowadays in set phrases (for example  = 'in other words').

If the person performing the action of the verb is the same as the person in the equivalent relative clause, then the verb uses the appropriate personal possessive suffix on the verb for the person. If the person in the main clause is different from that in the relative clause then this is indicated by with the person in the genitive and the verb is unmarked for person.

{| class="wikitable"
|-
! Second infinitive inessive
! Equivalent  phrase
! English translation
|-
| 
| 
| when I was in England, I went into many pubs
|-
| 
| 
| when they were in England, they went into many pubs
|-
| 
| 
| when Jaakko was in England, Laura went to Spain
|}

Third infinitive
This corresponds to the English gerund ("verb + -ing" form), and behaves as a noun in Finnish in that it can be inflected, but only in a limited number of cases. It is used to refer to a particular act or occasion of the verb's action.

The third infinitive is formed by taking the verb stem with its consonant in the strong form, then adding  followed by the case inflection.

The cases in which the third infinitive can appear are:

{| class="wikitable"
|-
! Case !! Finnish !! English
|-
| rowspan="2" | inessive ||  || '(in the act of) reading'
|-
| Example:  || 's/he's reading in the library'
|-
|elative ||  || '(from just having been) reading'
|-
|illative ||  || '(about to be / with the intention of) reading'
|-
|adessive ||  || '(by) reading'
|-
|abessive ||  || '(without) reading'
|}

A rare and archaic form of the third infinitive which occurs with the verb :

{| class="wikitable"
|-
! Case !! Finnish !! English
|-
| instructive ||  || 'you must not read'
|}

The third infinitive instructive is usually replaced with the first infinitive short form in modern Finnish.

Note that the  form without a case ending is called the 'agent participle' (see #Participles below). The agent participle can also be inflected in all cases, producing forms which look similar to the third infinitive.

Fourth infinitive
The fourth infinitive has the stem ending  and indicates obligation, but it is quite rare in Finnish today. This is because there are other words like  and  that can convey this meaning.

For example

{| class="wikitable"
|-
|+ Fourth Infinitive
|-
! Finnish !! English
|-
|  || 'There is no going there' i.e. 'One must not go there'
|}

Though not an infinitive, a much more common  verbal stem ending is the noun construct which gives the name of the activity described by the verb. This is rather similar to the English verbal noun '-ing' form, and therefore as a noun, this form can inflect just like any other noun.

{| class="wikitable"
|-
|+  noun formation
|-
! Finnish !! English
|-
|  || 'reading is fun'
|-
|  || 'I hate reading'
|-
|  || 'I enjoy reading'
|}

Fifth infinitive
This is a fairly rare form which has the meaning 'on the point of ...ing / just about to ...'

{| class="wikitable"
|-
|+ Fifth infinitive
|-
! Finnish !! English
|-
|  || 'I was just about to read'
|}

Verb conjugation
For full details of how verbs are conjugated in Finnish, please refer to the Finnish verb conjugation article.

Participles
Finnish verbs have past and present participles, both with passive and active forms, and an 'agent' participle. Participles can be used in different ways than ordinary adjectives and they can have an object.

Past passive participle

{| class="wikitable"
|-
! Finnish !! English
|-
| 
| 'after you went home'[ II participle   +  suffix]
|}

Past active participle
For example:

{| class="wikitable"
|-
! 1st infinitive!! active past participle
|-
|  || 
|-
|  || 
|}

However, depending on the verb's stem type, assimilation can occur with the consonant of the stem ending.

{| class="wikitable"
|-
! 1st Infinitive!! Stem !! Active past participle
|-
|  || || 
|-
|  || || 
|-
|  || || 
|}

The assimilation causes the final consonant cluster to be strengthened which in turn can weaken a strong cluster if one exists in the stem.

{| class="wikitable"
|-
! 1st infinitive!! Stem !! Active past participle
|-
|  || || 
|-
|  || || 
|-
|  || || 
|}

Present passive participle
The present passive participle can be constructed from the past passive form of the verb. For example:
{| class="wikitable"
|-
! Infinitive !! Past passive!! Passive participle !! English
|-
|  ||  ||  || which is to be given
|-
|  ||  ||  || which is to be eaten
|-
|  ||  ||  || which is to be told
|}
It is possible to translate this participle in several related ways e.g.  'which must be/is to be said', 'which can be said', 'which will be said' or 'which is said'.
Here are some sentences and phrases further illustrating the formation and use of the present passive participle:
{| class="wikitable"
|-
! Finnish !! English
|-
|  || Drinkable water
|-
|  || Do you have anything to say?
|-
|  || Is there anything to eat on the table? Or even, Is there anything edible on the table?
|}
This participle can also be used in other ways. If used with the appropriate third-person singular form of the verb  and with the subject in the genitive it can express necessity or obligation.

 'I must leave'
 'They would have to go'

Inflected in the inessive plural, it can be used in conjunction with the verb 'to be' to indicate that something can or cannot be done.

 'Is Pekka available?'/'Is Pekka able to be met with?'

Present active participle
This participle is formed simply by finding the 3rd person plural form of the verb and removing -t, and acts as an adjective describing what the object or subject of the sentence is doing, for example:

{| class="wikitable"
|-
|+ Present active participle
|-
! Finnish !! English
|-
|  || 'sleeping dog'
|-
|  || 'blinding light'
|-
|  || 'I pretended to be reading'[ I participle  essive +  suffix]
|}

Agent participle
The agent participle is formed in a similar way as the third infinitive (see above), adding -ma or -mä to the verb stem. It allows the property of being a target of an action to be formatted as an adjective-like attribute. Like adjectives, it can be inflected in all cases. For example,  "a man-made formation". The party performing the action is indicated by the use of genitive, or by a possessive suffix. This is reflected in English, too:  – "of man's making", or  "book of my writing". For example:

{| class="wikitable"
|-
|+ Agent participle
|-
! Finnish !! English
|-
|  || the book read by the girl
|-
|  || (partitive) the book read by the girl
|-
|  || in the book read by the girl
|-
| colspan="2" align="center" | etc.
|}
It is not required for the action to be in the past, although the examples above are. Rather, the construction simply specifies the subject, the object and the action, with no reference to time. For an example in the future, consider:  "tomorrow, as the instrument you will be using is...". Here,  "that which is used" describes, i.e. is an attribute to  "instrument".

It is also possible to give the actor with a pronoun, e.g.  "that which was used by you". In standard language, the pronoun  "your" is not necessary, but the possessive suffix is. In inexact spoken usage, this goes vice versa; the possessive suffix is optional, and used typically only for the second-person singular, e.g. .

Negation of verbs

Present indicative
Verbs are negated by using a negative verb in front of the stem from the present tense (in its 'weak' consonant form). This verb form used with the negative verb is called a connegative.

{| class="wikitable"
|-
|+ Present indicative
|-
! Finnish !! English !! !! Finnish !! English
|-
! colspan="5" style="background:#efefef;" | Singular
|-
|  || 'I know' || → ||  || 'I don't know'
|-
|  || 'you know' || → ||  || 'you don't know'
|-
|  || '(s)he knows' || → ||  || '(s)he doesn't know'
|-
! colspan="5" style="background:#efefef;" | Plural
|-
|  || 'we know' || → ||  || 'we don't know'
|-
|  || 'you know' || → ||  || 'you don't know'
|-
|  || 'they know' || → ||  || 'they don't know'
|}

Note that the inflection is on the negative verb, not on the main verb, and that the endings are regular apart from the 3rd-person forms.

Present passive
The negative is formed from the third-person singular "negative verb"  and the present passive with the final  removed:

{| class="wikitable"
|-
! Finnish !! English
|-
|  || 'it is not spoken'
|-
|  || 'it is not known'
|}

Imperfect indicative
The negative is formed from the appropriate part of the negative verb followed by the nominative form (either singular or plural depending on the number of the verb's subject) of the active past participle. So for  the pattern is:

{| class="wikitable"
|-
|+ Imperfect indicative
|-
! Finnish !! English
|-
! colspan="2" style="background:#efefef;" | Singular
|-
|  || 'I did not speak'
|-
|  || 'you did not speak'
|-
|  || '(s/he) did not speak'
|-
! colspan="2" style="background:#efefef;" | Plural
|-
|  || 'we did not speak'
|-
|  || 'you did not speak'
|-
|  || 'they did not speak'
|}

Note one exception: when the 'te' 2nd-person plural form is used in an honorific way to address one person, the singular form of the participle is used:  = 'you ( polite) did not speak'.

Imperfect passive
The negative is formed from the third-person singular negative verb – 'ei' – and the nominative singular form of the passive present participle (compare this with the negative of the imperfect indicative):

{| class="wikitable"
|-
|+ Imperfect passive
|-
! Finnish !! English
|-
|  || 'it was not spoken'
|-
|  || 'it was not known'
|}

Note that in the spoken language, this form is used for the first-person plural. In this case, the personal pronoun is obligatory:

{| class="wikitable"
|-
! Finnish !! English
|-
|  || 'we did not go'
|}

Adverbs
A very common way of forming adverbs is by adding the ending  to the inflecting form of the corresponding adjective:

{| class="wikitable"
|-
|+ Adverbs
|-
! Finnish !! English
|-
|  || 'quick, quickly'
|-
|  || 'beautiful, beautifully'
|-
|  || 'slow, slowly'
|-
|  || 'easy, easily'
|}

Adverbs modify verbs, not nouns, therefore they do not inflect.  adverbs are not used to modify adjectives (such as to express degree) like  adverbs might be in English; the genitive of adjectives is used for this purpose.

Comparative formation
The comparative form of the adverb has the ending .

{| class="wikitable"
|-
|+ Comparative formation
|-
! Finnish !! English
|-
|  || 'quick, quickly, more quickly/faster'
|-
|  || 'beautiful, beautifully, more beautifully'
|-
|  || 'slow, slowly, more slowly'
|-
|  || 'easy, easily, more easily'
|}

Superlative formation
The superlative form of the adverb has the ending .

{| class="wikitable"
|-
|+ Superlative formation
|-
! Finnish !! English
|-
|  || 'easy, easily, more easily, most easily'
|}

{| class="wikitable"
|-
! Finnish !! English
|-
|  || 'quick, quickly, more quickly/faster, fastest'
|-
|  || 'beautiful, beautifully, more beautifully, most beautifully'
|-
|  || 'slow, slowly, more slowly, most slowly'
|}

Irregular forms
There are a number of irregular adverbs, including:

{| class="wikitable"
|-
|+ Irregular forms
|-
! Finnish !! English
|-
|  || 'good, well, better, best'
|}

Numbers

The ordinary counting numbers (cardinals) from 0 to 10 are given in the table below. Cardinal numbers may be inflected and some of the inflected forms are irregular in form.

(*) sometimes  (alternative form) 

In colloquial spoken Finnish, the numerals usually appear in contracted forms.

Hyphens are written here to separate morphemes. In Finnish text, hyphens are not written.
"one of the second, two of the second, ... nine of the second"
11, 12, ... 19
In older Finnish, until about the early 20th Century, the same pattern was used up to one hundred:  'thirty-three'.

Sentence structure

Word order
Since Finnish is an inflected language, word order within sentences can be much freer than, for example, English. In English the strong subject–verb–object order typically indicates the function of a noun as either subject or object although some English structures allow this to be reversed. In Finnish sentences, however, the role of the noun is determined not by word order or sentence structure as in English but by case markings which indicate subject and object.

The most usual neutral order, however, is subject–verb–object. But usually what the speaker or writer is talking about is at the head of the sentence.

{| class="wikitable"
|-
! Finnish !! English!!Note
|-
|  || 'the dog bit the man' || we are talking of the dog and what it did
|-
|  || 'the man was bitten by a/the dog' ||we are talking about the man and what it was that bit him, e.g. not a snake
|-
|  || 'the dog bit the man' || we are talking of the dog's actions in a somewhat poetic form or confirming that it was the dog that bit the man, not some other animal
|}

Here  ('dog') is in the nominative form but  ('man') is marked as object by the case marked form . This sentence is a bald statement of fact. Changing the word order changes the emphasis slightly but not the fundamental meaning of the sentence.

{| class="wikitable"
|-
! Finnish !! English !! Note
|-
|  || 'I have money' || a bald statement of fact
|-
|  || 'money is something I do have' || although I may not have something else
|-
|  || 'The money is with me' || I am telling you where the money is
|-
|  || 'I've definitely got (the) money' || I am confirming that I do have (the) money
|-
|  || 'Yes, I do have (the) money' || if having money has been questioned
|}

 here is the word  (I) in a case form ending  which when used with the verb  (to be, expressed here in the form ) expresses ownership. This is because Finnish does not have a verb form equivalent of the English word 'have'.  is not considered the subject.

And finally, a classic example:

{| class="wikitable"
|-
! Finnish !! Translation
|-
|  || 'I am the state' (matter-of-fact)
|-
|  || '' (French – attributed to Louis XIV)
|}

Besides the word-order implications of turning a sentence into a question, there are some other circumstances where word-order is important:

Existential sentences
These are sentences which introduce a new subject – they often begin with 'there is' or 'there are' in English.

{| class="wikitable"
|-
! Finnish !! English
|-
| || 'there is a bed in the room'
|}

The location of the thing whose existence is being stated comes first, followed by its stative verb, followed by the thing itself. Note how this is unlike the normal English equivalent, though English can also use the same order:

{| class="wikitable"
|-
! Finnish !! English
|-
|  || '(in/out) there stood a man'
|}

Forming questions
There are two main ways of forming a question – either using a specific question word, or by adding a  suffix to one of the words in a sentence. A question word is placed first in the sentence, and a word with the interrogative suffix is also moved to this position:

{| class="wikitable"
|-
|+ Interrogatives (questions)
|-
! Finnish !! English
|-
|  || 'what is this?'
|-
|  || 'this is a book'
|-
|  || 'is this a book?'
|-
|  || 'is this a book?'
|-
|  || 'is this a book?'
|-
|  || 'is this not a book?'(note the  goes on the negative verb)
|}

Forming answers 
The response to a question will of course depend on the situation, but grammatically the response to a question typically follows the grammatical structure in the question. Thus a question structured in the inessive case (e.g.  'in which town do you live?') will have an answer that is also in the inessive (e.g.  'in Espoo') unless special rules dictate otherwise. Questions which in English would be answered with 'yes' or 'no' replies are usually responded to by repeating the verb in either the affirmative or negative.

{| class="wikitable"
|-
|+ Interrogatives (questions)
|-
! Finnish !! English
|-
|  || 'which way are they headed?'
|-
|  || 'towards Helsinki'
|-
|  || 'have you got the key?' 
|-
| / || 'yes'/'no' ( 'is'/'is not' in possession)
|-
|  || 'are you guys going to the movies?'
|-
| / || 'yes'/'no' ( 'we are going'/'we are not going')
|-
|  || 'Are you intending to go off without a hat?'
|-
|  || 'Yes' ( 'I intend')
|}

The typical response to a question which in English is answered 'yes' or 'no' is, as we see above, more usually answered by repeating the verb in either an affirmative or negative form in the appropriate person. The word 'kyllä' is rather a strong affirmation in response to a question and is similar to the word 'niin' which is an affirmation of a response to a statement of fact or belief. (However, in conversations,  may even simply mean that the sentence was heard, not expressing any sort of concurrence. The same problem occurs with the colloquial  "yeah".)

{| class="wikitable"
|-
|+ Kyllä and Niin
|-
! Finnish !! English
|-
|  (question)|| 'Are you intending to go off without a hat?'
|-
|  || 'Yes, I sure am' (Strong affirmation. I really do intend to go bareheaded)
|-
|  (statement) || 'it is foolish to go out in wintertime without a hat'
|-
|  || 'Yes indeed' (I agree with your statement)
|}

The word  is the negative verb form and has to be inflected for person and the verb itself is usually present, though not always.

 'can you (speak) German?'
 ('no';  'I don't')
or better
 ('I can't')

See also
 Finnish
 Finnish phonology
 Finnish numerals
 Iso suomen kielioppi

References

Further reading